Timothy 'Tim' P. Begalka (born February 19, 1960 in Clear Lake, South Dakota) is an American politician and a Republican member of the South Dakota Senate representing District 4 since January 11, 2011. Begalka served non-consecutively in the South Dakota Legislature from January 2001 until January 2005 in the South Dakota House of Representatives District 4 seat.

Education
Begalka earned his BS degree from South Dakota State University.

Elections
2012 Begalka was challenged in the June 5, 2012 Republican Primary by Representative Speaker of the House Valentine Rausch, but won with 1,106 votes (66.83%). Begalka won the November 6, 2012 General election with 6,603 votes (60.97%) against Democratic Representative Steve Street.
2000 When House District 4 incumbent Republican Representatives Larry Diedrich and Robert Weber both ran for South Dakota Senate, Begalka ran in the three-way 2000 Republican Primary and placed second with 971 votes (32.39%) ahead of third by 8 votes; in the four-way November 7, 2000 General election Democratic nominee James R. Peterson took the first seat and Begalka took the second seat with 4,322 votes (26.72%) ahead of fellow Republican nominee Valentine Rausch and Democratic nominee Ron Foster;
2002 Begalka and Craig Haugaard, who had placed third in the 2000 Republican Primary, were unopposed for the June 4, 2002 Republican Primary; in the five-way November 5, 2002 General election Begalka took the first seat with 5,651 votes (32.69%) and incumbent Democratic Representative Peterson took the second seat ahead of Republican nominee Haugaard, Democratic nominee Dawn Jaeger, and Independent candidate Larry Rudebusch.
2010 When Senate District 4 incumbent Democratic Senator Peterson left the Legislature and left the seat open, Begalka won the June 8, 2010 Republican Primary with 1,387 votes (61.78%) and won the November 2, 2010 General election with 5,346 votes (61%) against Democratic nominee Dick Schwandt.

References

External links
Official page at the South Dakota Legislature

Tim Begalka at Ballotpedia
Tim Begalka at the National Institute on Money in State Politics

1960 births
Living people
Republican Party members of the South Dakota House of Representatives
People from Deuel County, South Dakota
Republican Party South Dakota state senators
South Dakota State University alumni